Charles Allen Moye Jr. (July 13, 1918 – July 26, 2010) was a United States district judge of the United States District Court for the Northern District of Georgia.

Education and career

Born in Atlanta, Georgia, Moye received an Artium Baccalaureus degree from Emory University in 1939 and a Juris Doctor from Emory University School of Law in 1943. He was in private practice in Atlanta from 1943 to 1970, and was an unsuccessful candidate for the United States House of Representatives from Georgia in 1954.

Federal judicial service

On October 7, 1970, Moye was nominated by President Richard Nixon to a new seat on the United States District Court for the Northern District of Georgia created by 84 Stat. 294. He was confirmed by the United States Senate on October 13, 1970, and received his commission on October 16, 1970. He served as Chief Judge from 1979 to 1987, assuming senior status on January 1, 1988. His service terminated on July 26, 2010, due to his death in Marietta, Georgia.

References

Sources
 

1918 births
Judges of the United States District Court for the Northern District of Georgia
United States district court judges appointed by Richard Nixon
20th-century American judges
2010 deaths
People from Atlanta
Emory University School of Law alumni